Radical 142 or radical insect meaning "insect" or "worm" is one of the 29 Kangxi radicals (214 radicals in total) composed of 6 strokes.

In the Kangxi Dictionary, there are 1067 characters (out of 49,030) to be found under this radical.

 is also the 131st indexing component in the Table of Indexing Chinese Character Components predominantly adopted by Simplified Chinese dictionaries published in mainland China.

The character  models a worm. To derive from this, characters meaning creeping animals such as reptiles, insects, worms, amphibians, and shellfish are included in this radical. The character 虫 is used as the simplified form of 蟲 in Simplified Chinese and Japanese and occasionally in Traditional Chinese.

Evolution

Derived characters

Literature

External links

Unihan Database - U+866B

142
131